The soundtrack album of the fifth season of HBO series Game of Thrones, titled Game of Thrones: Season 5, was released digitally on June 9, 2015, and on CD on July 17, 2015. The album was composed by Ramin Djawadi.

Reception
The soundtrack received positive reviews from critics.

Track listing

Credits and personnel
Personnel adapted from the album liner notes.

 David Benioff – liner notes
 Ramin Djawadi – composer, primary artist, producer
 Czech Film Orchestra and Choir – primary artist 
 Bradley Hanan Carter – featured artist 
 D.B. Weiss – liner notes

References

Ramin Djawadi soundtracks
2015 soundtrack albums
Soundtrack
Classical music soundtracks
Instrumental soundtracks
Television soundtracks
WaterTower Music soundtracks